Carlos Sosa is an American musician, producer, composer, music director, and arranger. Heavily influenced by the R&B and funk sounds of the 1970s, Sosa founded Grooveline Horns in 1996, and is best known for touring and recording with Maroon 5, Kelly Clarkson, Jason Mraz, Zac Brown Band, and Hanson.

Early influences and career
Sosa started playing saxophone around the age of 10. When he was 15, he joined a funk band and started playing clubs in Texas. Heavily influenced by Earth, Wind & Fire, James Brown and Parliament-Funkadelic, he knew his musical preferences leaned heavily towards funk, R&B, soul and pop music.

He attended Texas State University, getting a degree in Audio Engineering. While in college, he formed Grooveline Horns and they played with various cover bands on 6th Street, honing their versatility.  Within a short time, they began playing with Austin musician Bob Schneider. This led to bigger acts using the group including Don Henley, Suicidal Tendencies, and Kelly Clarkson.

Awards

|-
| style="text-align:center;" | 2009
| We Sing. We Dance. We Steal Things., Jason Mraz
| 2009 Teen Choice Awards
|  
|-
| style="text-align:center;" | 2005
| Best Groupera Album, La Mafia
| Latin Grammy Awards
|  
|-
| style="text-align:center;" | 2004
| Spanish Album of the Year, Con Poder, Salvador
| 35th GMA Dove Awards
|
|-
| style="text-align:center;" | 1997
| Best Horns: Grooveline Horns, The Scabs
| Austin Music Awards
| 
|-
| style="text-align:center;" | 1998
| Best Horns: Grooveline Horns
| Austin Music Awards
| 
|-
| style="text-align:center;" | 1999
| Best Horns: Grooveline Horns
| Austin Music Awards
| 
|-
| style="text-align:center;" | 2000
| Best Horns: Grooveline Horns, The Scabs
| Austin Music Awards
| 
|-
| style="text-align:center;" | 2001
| Best Horns: Grooveline Horns
| Austin Music Awards
| 
|-
| style="text-align:center;" | 2003
| Best Horns: Grooveline Horns
| Austin Music Awards
| 
|-
| style="text-align:center;" | 2006
| Best Horns: Grooveline Horns
| Austin Music Awards
| 
|-

Discography

Singles

Tours

Music community and advocacy

Carlos is an active member of the Texas Chapter Board of Governors for the Recording Academy (also known as the GRAMMYs), having held office as both President and Vice President.

He is on the board of directors for the SIMS Foundation, and has advocated with local politicians regarding the epidemic of opioid abuse.

Sosa is also an Advisory Board Member of Black Fret, a non-profit organization that provides grants and mentorship to musicians.

He has advocated for passing laws for royalty payments for musicians in the US, providing parity with the rest of the world.

After the 2017 Las Vegas shooting while playing with Josh Abbott band, he urged fans to continue going to shows.

External links
 Facebook
 Instagram
 Twitter

References

American horn players
Musicians from San Antonio
Musicians from Austin, Texas
Brass musicians